Areli Betsiel Hernández Huerta (born 22 December 1994) is a Mexican professional footballer who plays as a defender.

References

Living people
1994 births
Association football defenders
Querétaro F.C. footballers
Atlético San Luis footballers
Cafetaleros de Chiapas footballers
Cimarrones de Sonora players
Liga MX players
Ascenso MX players
Liga Premier de México players
Tercera División de México players
Footballers from San Luis Potosí
People from Rioverde, San Luis Potosí
Mexican footballers